Marguerite Kofio (born 1955) is a Central African politician and women's rights activist. In 2008 she was elected president of the Organisation de femmes centrafricaines (OFCA), an office she held until she was succeeded by Marguerite Ramadan in 2017.

References

1955 births
Living people
Central African Republic women in politics
Central African Republic activists
Central African Republic women activists